Parallelolebes is a genus of trematodes in the family Opecoelidae.

Species
Parallelolebes australis Martin, Ribu, Cutmore & Cribb, 2018
Parallelolebes elongatus (Ozaki, 1937) Martin, Ribu, Cutmore & Cribb, 2018
Parallelolebes virilis Martin, Ribu, Cutmore & Cribb, 2018

References

Opecoelidae
Plagiorchiida genera